Broll may refer to:

Broll, a by-product of wheat milling
Broll, a surname
 B-roll, the supplemental or alternate footage intercut with the main shot in an interview or documentary
 David Broll, Canadian ice hockey player